The following is a list of presidents of OFC, the Oceanic association football governing body.

Presidents of OFC 

 Notes

 David Chung served as interim president before being elected in 2011.
 Lambert Maltock served as interim president before being elected in 2019.

See also
List of presidents of FIFA
List of presidents of AFC
List of presidents of CAF
List of presidents of UEFA
List of presidents of CONMEBOL
List of presidents of CONCACAF

References

 
Presidents of OFC
OFC